Cuppers are intercollegiate sporting competitions at the Universities of Oxford and Cambridge. The term comes from the word "cup" and is an example of the Oxford "-er". Each sport holds only one Cuppers competition each year, which is open to all colleges. Most Cuppers competitions use the single elimination system. The main exception is that rowing is organised into The Bumps as opposed to a Cuppers-style tournament.

History 
The term 'Cuppers' has been used since 1882 at both Cambridge and Oxford.  Cambridge's original football cuppers was contested by twelve teams: nine college teams (Caius, St John's, Clare, St Catharine's, Pembroke, Sidney, Jesus, King's and Trinity Hall) and three alumni teams (Old Harrovians, Trinity Etonians and Trinity Rest). Since then, the competition has expanded to 31 teams, including Anglia Ruskin University. Over time, the number of sports with Cuppers competitions has gradually increased. The most recent addition was Cuppers Poker (Cambridge) in 2008, won by Churchill. The term can also apply to an intercollegiate drama competition which relies upon the involvement of new undergraduates or freshers.

Current competitions 
Cuppers competitions include:

 Alternative Ice Hockey (ALTS)
 Athletics
 Badminton
 Basketball
 Bridge
 Cricket
 Croquet
 Cycling
 Dancesport
 Drama
 Football
 Field hockey
 Floorball (Oxford only)
 Lacrosse
 Lawn tennis
 Lifesaving (Oxford only)
 Modern pentathlon
 Motor drivers
 Netball
 Orienteering
 Pillow Fighting
 Pistol (Oxford only)
 Polo
 Pool
 Powerlifting
 Rugby
 Sailing
 Squash
 Swimming
 Table tennis
 Tennis
 Trampolining
 Triathlon
 Ultimate Frisbee
 Underwater hockey (Oxford only)
 Volleyball
 Water polo

References 

Sport at the University of Cambridge
Terminology of the University of Cambridge
Sport at the University of Oxford
Terminology of the University of Oxford
Recurring sporting events established in 1882